Innokentyevka is the name of several rural localities in Russia:
Innokentyevka, Arkharinsky District, Amur Oblast, a selo in Innokentyevsky Selsoviet of Arkharinsky District
Innokentyevka, Zavitinsky District, Amur Oblast, a selo in Innokentyevsky Selsoviet of Zavitinsky District